The 2017–18 World Boxing Super Series – super middleweight division is a World Boxing Super Series professional boxing tournament taking place between September 2017 and September 2018 in several countries. The Super Series features 8 top-rated super middleweight boxers in a single-elimination tournament. Its winner will hold the WBA's world title, The Ring Magazine title, as well as the Muhammad Ali trophy. The tournament was organized by Comosa AG. A cruiserweight tournament is held concurrently, with prize money for both competitions totalling US$50 million.

Participants 

The final participant was decided by the winner of the Chris Eubank Jr. vs. Arthur Abraham fight. The bout occurred after the draft, with Eubank Jr. winning by unanimous decision.
Patrick Nielsen and Vincent Feigenbutz are tournament reserves.

Bracket 
The format of the tournament required 4 seeded fighters to each choose their opponent from the 4 remaining unseeded fighters in a draft. The seeded fighters were determined by the organizers. The draft took place on July 8, 2017, in a gala hosted by actress Melanie Winiger in Monte Carlo. Chris Eubank chose the opponent for the winner of the Eubank Jr. vs Abraham bout.

*Jürgen Brähmer withdrew from the semi-final due to an illness and was replaced by Nieky Holzken.

Quarterfinals

Smith vs. Skoglund 

The first WBSS super middleweight match featured Callum Smith and Erik Skoglund, two young undefeated fighters, competing for a spot in the semifinals. At the official weigh-in, Smith hit the scales at 167 3⁄5 lbs, while Skoglund weighed-in around 167 3⁄5 lbs. The fight took place at Echo Arena in Liverpool and was announced by Jimmy Lennon Jr.

Smith beat Skoglund by unanimous decision to win one of four quarter-finals in front of his home crowd in Liverpool. The officials scored the fight 116–112, 117–110 and 117–111 all in favor of Smith. Now unbeaten in 23 bouts, Smith also claimed the WBC Diamond belt and became the first semi-finalist in the super middleweight World Boxing Super Series. Early on, the fight appeared to be a mismatch with Smith outclassing his opponent. However, Skoglund got himself into the fight in the middle rounds behind his consistent jab and head movement, giving Smith a bloody nose. Smith would make his own surge late in the fight, scoring a knockdown in round 11 and earning a clear unanimous decision.

Eubank vs. Yıldırım

The super middleweight tournament resumed with Chris Eubank Jr. defending his IBO title against Avni Yıldırım. The fight was scheduled for October 6, at the Hanns-Martin-Schleyer-Halle in Stuttgart. In the lead-up to the fight, Ahmet Öner, Yıldırım's manager, got into a one-sided confrontation with Eubank's camp at a press conference. Öner called Eubank arrogant, threatened to knock someone out, and yelled "When you laugh, you son of a bitch, I fuck your wife in your bed!" at a man off-stage. At the weigh-in, Eubank tipped the scales at 167 7⁄10 lbs, while Yıldırım weighed in at 168 lbs.

On fight night, Eubank blasted Yıldırım, knocking him out in round 3. Eubank dropped his opponent with an uppercut in the first round, and finished him with a flurry of punches punctuated with a left hook in round 3.

The undercard featured a 10-round bout between former Olympians Stefan Härtel and Viktor Polyakov, which was controversially won by Härtel by majority decision. Upon being announced, the decision was booed by the audience at the Hanns-Martin-Schleyer-Halle. A brawl broke out in the stands moments before the main event.

Groves vs. Cox 

George Groves sought to defend his WBA (Super) title against Jamie Cox at the Wembley Arena in the super middleweight competition's third quarter-final match. Both fighters made weight the day before the fight, with Groves coming in at 167 1⁄10 lb, while Cox weighed 167 4⁄5 lb.

After a tentative first round, Cox managed to corner Groves and hit him with accurate combination punching during round 2. Cox pressed Groves for the rest of the fight but Groves slowly started countering him with accurate timing. The fight ended in round 4, when Groves landed an uppercut to Cox's solar plexus which dropped the challenger. Cox was unable to recover as the referee counted him out. The win set up another domestic showdown for Groves, who is scheduled to face Eubank in the semifinals.

The undercard features tournament alternate Patrick Nielsen taking on local fighter John Ryder. Ryder blasted Nielsen, dropping him after two rounds. Nielsen was then hurt in round five by a right hook, which also dislodged his gumshield. Ryder then pounced on Nielsen, who wasn't defending himself and went down and out.

Brähmer vs. Brant 

The final Super Series quarterfinal featured Jürgen Brähmer going against Robert Brant. Both competitors had recently fought at other weights, with Brähmer being a former light heavyweight world champion and Brant a fringe middleweight contender. Brähmer's last fight at super middleweight was a decision win over Mario Veit. At the weigh-in, Brähmer weighed 166 9⁄10 lb, while Brant tipped the scales at 166 lb even.

Brähmer got a dominant decision win, outboxing and outworking Brant over twelve rounds. Brant was unable to cope with Brähmer's refined technique, and he eventually seemed to tire out. Brant had only fought ten rounds once before and he had never fought twelve rounds. Brähmer's promoter and tournament organizer, Kalle Sauerland, called it Brähmer's best performance of all time.

Tournament reserve Vincent Feigenbutz picked up a win on the undercard, with a round 11 TKO over Gastón Vega.

Semifinals
The semifinals took place on 17 and 24 February 2018.

*Jürgen Brähmer withdrew from the semi-final due to an illness and was replaced by Nieky Holzken.

Final
The final was scheduled for 14 July 2018 in London, but later it was rescheduled for 28 September 2018 in Jeddah.

See also 
 2017–18 World Boxing Super Series – cruiserweight division

References 

World Boxing Super Series
World Boxing Super Series
World Boxing Super Series